Paul Weber may refer to:
Paul Weber (artist) (1823–1916), German artist
Andreas Paul Weber (1893–1980), German artist and cartoonist
Paul Weber (academic) (1904–1983), interim president of Georgia Tech
 Paul Weber (unionist), 20th-Century Catholic American unionist